Union for the Local Employees in Missions Accredited to South Africa (ULEMASA) is a trade union formed by local employees working for diplomatic missions in South Africa.

History 
According to the article published by diplomatic Society Newspaper, on 9 June 2018, workers in the Diplomatic sector met at the Union Buildings for talks on forming a trade union for all of the local South African and migrant workers recruited by the foreign missions, such as Embassies and International Organizations in South Africa, which followed talks between the representatives and the former Minister of the Department of International Relations and Cooperation (DIRCO) Lindiwe Sisulu and the Department of Labour in the capital district Tshwane, Pretoria.

Several resolutions were passed at the first meeting, namely:

To focus on exploitation of (mostly women) workers in the Embassies, High Commissions, Consulates and international organizations in South Africa
To demand fair recruitment process and labour law practices
To force foreign missions in South Africa to abide by local labour laws and any other applicable laws
To demand minimum wage and equal opportunities for all workers regardless of race or origin
To force the Department of International Relations & Cooperation (DIRCO) to remind and advise embassy employees including Ambassadors, other representatives and their families in the accredited missions who enjoy diplomatic immunity and inviolability, on their duty to respect the laws and regulations of South Africa
To extend the demand to all foreign missions to respect the Vienna Convention on Diplomatic Relations of 1961

After successful talks on 18 July 2018, the Department of Labour  formally registered ULEMASA. Mr Abram Namanyane Sello Pelo, was the first President, Mr Sipho Maphalala, Deputy President and Mr Muhirhi Richard Ngekama was the first Elected General Secretary of the Organization.

Affiliation 
ULEMASA came to a decision in September 2018 after the 13th National Congress of Congress of South African Trade Unions (COSATU) to affiliate with World Federation of Trade Unions.

Recognition 
On 25 September 2018 The Department of International Relations and Cooperation sent official notification to all the heads of foreign states in the Republic notifying them of the registration of ULEMASA.

Third Democratic Elections 
During its National Congress that was held in Pretoria (Tshwane) on 27 February 2021, Mr. Darlington Karumbiza was elected as the 3rd president of ULEMASA.

Fight Against Violation of Human Rights and Unfair Labour Practices 
ULEMASA held a picket against Libyan embassy officials in Pretoria for forcing embassy workers to undergo HIV tests in August 2020.
Picket against Algerian Ambassador Abd-El-Naceur Belaid in a case of sexual harassment.
Picket at the United Arab Emirates Embassy in Pretoria on charges of discrimination against local employees.

Current officeholders 
National Office Bearers
 President: Vacant
 Deputy-President: Vacant
 Secretary-General: Vacant
 Treasurer: Vacant

References

External 
 Official Site

 Organisations based in Pretoria
 World Federation of Trade Unions
 Trade unions established in 2018
Trade unions in South Africa
South African diplomats